Magdalena Gamayo (born 13 August 1924) is a Filipino weaver who is a lead-practitioner of the Ilocano tradition of pinagabel.

Background
Magdalena Gamayo, a native of Pinili, Ilocos Norte, learned the Ilocano weaving tradition of making inabel from her aunt at age 16. She taught herself on how to execute the traditional patterns of binakol, inuritan (geometric design), kusikos (orange-like spiral forms), and sinan-sabong (flowers). She became best known for weaving the sinan-sabong, since it is the most challenging pattern among the four.

Her father bought her first loom, made by a local craftman using sag'gat hardwood. Gamayo's loom lasted for 30 years. Already past 80 years old, Gamayo remained committed in making inabel.

On November 8, 2012, she was conferred the National Living Treasure Award.

In late 2016, the House of Inabel was inaugurated enabling Gamayo to further promote pinagabel.

References 

1924 births
Filipino weavers
National Living Treasures of the Philippines
People from Ilocos Norte
20th-century Filipino artists
21st-century Filipino artists
Living people